James "Jamie" Sherbrooke Waldegrave, 13th Earl Waldegrave (born 8 December 1940), styled Viscount Chewton until 1995, is a British peer and businessman.

Waldegrave is the son of Geoffrey Noel Waldegrave, 12th Earl Waldegrave (1905–1995), and Mary Hermione Grenfell (1909–1995), who studied at Somerville College, Oxford. Earl Waldegrave was educated at Eton and Trinity College, Cambridge, and stroked the Cambridge crew in the University Boat Race in 1962 and 1963. In 1986, he married Mary Alison Anthea Furness (born 10 November 1946), a journalist for the Evening Standard and philosophy lecturer. She is the daughter of the late Sir Robert Furness (1883–1954) and Joyce Lucy Sophie Marc (1905–1995). Earl Waldegrave inherited his father's titles in 1995. The marriage produced two sons, the couple divorced later in 1996.

Lord Waldegrave currently runs his estate based at Priory Farm, Chewton Mendip, Somerset, with industrial units and offices let out to various businesses upon the old cheese making site. Earl Waldegrave is the elder brother of William Waldegrave, Baron Waldegrave of North Hill, a former Conservative Cabinet Minister in Margaret Thatcher's government, and the brother of Lady Susan Hussey, who was Woman of the Bedchamber to Queen Elizabeth II.

References

External links

1940 births
Living people
Alumni of Trinity College, Cambridge
Cambridge University Boat Club rowers
English people of Cornish descent
21st-century British landowners
People educated at Eton College
People from Mendip District
Earls Waldegrave

Waldegrave